How People Got Fire is a short, poetic animated film from the Yukon.

Synopsis
In a snowy village, a talented young girl listens to her grandmother's story of how Crow got fire for the people. A magical realist exploration of aboriginal American spirituality, oral story-telling, and a northern childhood.

About the film
"This short film is based in part on the story told by the late Kitty Smith of the Kwanlin Dun First Nation."

The film was shot in Carcross-Tagish, Yukon and rotoscoped, with the addition of charcoal drawings by Christopher Auchter, and a contemporary classical sound track by Daniel Janke.

The film was the 2009 World Indigenous Film Awards Winner for Best Animation, and received the 2009 American Indian Film Festival Award, Best Animated Short. It received an award for Best Short Documentary at the 2009
Imagine Native Film + Media Arts Festival, Toronto, and the TEUEIKAN Second Prize at the 2009 First Peoples' Festival (Land InSights), Montréal. The film was a finalist for the Writers Guild of Canada 2010 Screenwriting Award for Short Subjects.

Festivals
"Tromsø International Film Festival, Frozen Land-Moving Pictures", Jan. 18-23, 2011
"Atlantic Film Festival", Sept. 16-25, 2010, Halifax, Nova Scotia
"Sprockets: Toronto International Film Festival for Children", April 17–23, 2010
"ECOFILMS: Rhodos International Films + Visual Arts Festival", 2010
"Animation Celebration!", Museum of the American Indian, New York, February 2010
"American Indian Film Festival", Nov. 6-14, 2009, San Francisco, CA
"ImagiNATIVE Film - Media Arts Festival", Oct. 14-18, 2009, Toronto
 "Reel to Real International Film Festival for Youth, Vancouver BC, 2009
"The Times BFI 53rd London Film Festival", 14–29 October 2009
"Dreamspeakers Film Festival", June 18–21, 2009
"Available Light Film Festival," Yukon Arts Center, 2009

See also
Angela Sidney
Raven in mythology
Prometheus
Kwanlin Dün First Nation
Carcross/Tagish First Nation

References

External links
 How People Got Fire - Local reactions
 Daniel Janke
 It Came From the Great White North - Skeptical review from Toonzone News
 Animation Insider review
 DVD Verdict review
 Watch  How People Got Fire at the National Film Board of Canada website (requires Adobe Flash)

National Film Board of Canada animated short films
Carcross, Yukon
2008 films
Films set in Yukon
First Nations films
Films shot in Yukon
2000s animated short films
Rotoscoped films
2008 animated films
Works about storytelling
2000s Canadian films